No Noise is the 17th Our Gang short subject comedy released. The Our Gang series (later known as "The Little Rascals") was created by Hal Roach in 1922, and continued production until 1944.

Plot
Mickey is in the hospital to have his tonsils removed. The gang decide to visit him, and end up causing all sorts of disasters. They manage to work their way into both the x-ray and operating rooms, and become subdued after inhaling some powerful laughing gas. The kids want to get in on the free ice cream given to patients getting their tonsils removed, and decide to switch places with some boys headed to the hospital. But the doctors catch onto the gang's scheme, and a chase through the hospital ensues.

Notes
When the television rights for the original silent Pathé Our Gang comedies were sold to National Telepix and other distributors, several episodes were retitled. This film was released into TV syndication as Mischief Makers in 1960 under the title "Operation Tonsils". About two-thirds of the original film was included. About two minutes of this film was edited with a film from the Hey Fellas! (a rival Our Gang series) into another Mischief Makers episode under the title "Rival Clinic".

Cast

The Gang
 Joe Cobb as Joe
 Jackie Condon as Jackie
 Mickey Daniels as Mickey
 Jack Davis as Jack
 Allen Hoskins as Farina
 Mary Kornman as Mary
 Ernie Morrison as Ernie
 Dinah the Mule as Herself

Additional cast
 Andy Samuel as Lewis De Vore, hospital patient
 Charles A. Bachman as Officer
 Beth Darlington as Mickey's Nurse
 Helen Gilmore as Nurse
 Clara Guiol as Nurse
 Lincoln Stedman as Doctor
 Charles Stevenson as Doctor
 Charley Young as Doctor

External links 
 
 
 

1923 films
1923 comedy films
Hal Roach Studios short films
American silent short films
American black-and-white films
Films directed by Robert F. McGowan
Our Gang films
1923 short films
1920s American films
Silent American comedy films